"So Inspired" is a 2011 song by Nigerian singer Waje. It also features Muna, a Nigerian rapper and model. It has been released as a promotional single from her upcoming debut album W.A.J.E.

The song is written from the perspective of a woman suffering from domestic violence, who despite the circumstances, rises above the trauma. The aim of the song in Waje’s own words, is “to inspire young people, females especially to continuously aspire for greatness regardless of the drawbacks in their environment and life in general.”

Music video 
The music video for the song was released onto YouTube on the 30th of March 2011. At the beginning, it shows Waje being subjected to domestic violence by a man. Waje then breaks into song, interspersed by verses of rapping by Muna. 
The music video for the song was shot in South Africa in Johannesburg.

References 

2010 singles
2010 songs